Krasňany is a village and municipality in Žilina District in the Žilina Region of northern Slovakia.

Etymology
Krasňany (Slovak) - a beautiful place.

History
In historical records the village was first mentioned in 1354 (Karzna).

Geography
The municipality lies at an altitude of 380 metres and covers an area of 15.175 km². It has a population of about 1231 people.

References

External links
https://web.archive.org/web/20100202015957/http://www.statistics.sk/mosmis/eng/run.html

Villages and municipalities in Žilina District